The Waterford Regional Sports Centre (or simply, the RSC) is part of Waterford Corporation's Municipal sporting facilities and home to Waterford F.C. of the League of Ireland. Waterford moved to the newly opened RSC from their former home, Kilcohan Park for the 1993-94 season and have remained there ever since.

Included on another site is an 18-hole pitch-and-putt course, an indoor hall, football pitches and tennis courts. The complex also had a Skateboard Park. The RSC comprises two stands. The Cork Road West Stand, opened in May 1996 has capacity of 1,275 seats.  The new Kilbarry side East Stand which holds 1,760 opened in May 2008 and brings seating capacity to 3,035. There are future plans to extend the West Stand to bring the overall seated capacity to near 5,000.

The RSC also contains a tartan athletics track which runs around the soccer pitch. The record attendance at the RSC was at the FAI Cup Semi-final in April 1997 when a crowd of 8,500 paid in to see Waterford United lose to Shelbourne 2-1.   

In June 2009 the Ireland under-21 side defeated Spain 2–1 in front of a capacity crowd of 3,400 at the RSC. In September 2009, it hosted the League of Ireland Cup Final as Bohemians beat Waterford United 3-1.

In February 2010 Munster A played Nottingham R.F.C. in the British and Irish Cup at the ground. 

The Republic of Ireland U-23 team played England C in May 2010 in a 2009–11 International Challenge Trophy game.

The RSC also hosted UEFA U21 European Championship Qualifiers when the Republic of Ireland played Holland, Russia and Switzerland. These games were televised live by Sky.
The Republic of Ireland U21 team also played Spain U21s in a friendly international at this venue.

It will host games at the 2019 UEFA European Under-17 Championship.

References

Buildings and structures in Waterford (city)
Sport in Waterford (city)
Sports venues in County Waterford
Athletics (track and field) venues in the Republic of Ireland
Association football in County Waterford
Association football venues in the Republic of Ireland
Waterford F.C.
1993 establishments in Ireland
Sports venues completed in 1993